Vector optimization is a subarea of mathematical optimization where optimization problems with a vector-valued objective functions are optimized with respect to a given partial ordering and subject to certain constraints.  A multi-objective optimization problem is a special case of a vector optimization problem: The objective space is the finite dimensional Euclidean space partially ordered by the component-wise "less than or equal to" ordering.

Problem formulation 
In mathematical terms, a vector optimization problem can be written as:

where  for a partially ordered vector space .

Solution concepts 
There are different minimality notions, among them:
  is a weakly efficient point (weak minimizer) if for every  one has .
  is an efficient point (minimizer) if for every  one has .
  is a properly efficient point (proper minimizer) if  is a weakly efficient point with respect to a closed pointed convex cone  where .

Every proper minimizer is a minimizer.  And every minimizer is a weak minimizer.

Modern solution concepts not only consists of minimality notions but also take into account infimum attainment.

Solution methods 
 Benson's algorithm for linear vector optimization problems.

Relation to multi-objective optimization 
Any multi-objective optimization problem can be written as

Thus the minimizer of this vector optimization problem are the Pareto efficient points.

References 

Mathematical optimization